Paul Fatt   (13 January 1924 – 28 September 2014) was a British neuroscientist, who was a professor at University College London. With Bernard Katz, he developed the "quantal hypothesis" for neurotransmitters.

Personal life
Paul married three times: Ione Copplestone (1926-2016) with whom he had three children: Michael (1954), Laura (1955), Harriet (1957); Gertrude Falk (1926–2008) with whom he had one child, Ilsa; and Carla Wartenberg fom 1985 till his death.

References

1924 births
2014 deaths
Academics of University College London
British neuroscientists
Fellows of the Royal Society
Jonathan F. Ashmore, PAUL FATT 13 January 1924 — 28 September 2014, in: https://royalsocietypublishing.org/doi/pdf/10.1098/rsbm.2016.0005